Sukujutut is a retail genealogy software for Windows. In 2004 it was the most popular software in its field in Finland.

References

External links 

Windows-only genealogy software